Bortnikov (masculine) or Bortnikova (feminine) is a Russian surname.

This surname is shared by the following people:

Bortnikov 
 Alexander Bortnikov (born 1951), Russian official, Director of the FSB since 2008
 Gennadi Bortnikov (1939–2007), Russian and Soviet actor
 Igor Bortnikov (born 1989), Russian professional ice hockey forward

Film 
 The Return of Vasili Bortnikov (1953), Soviet film directed by Vsevolod Pudovkin

Russian-language surnames